Lewis County Fairgrounds is a historic fairground and national historic district located at Lowville in Lewis County, New York. The district includes one contributing building and five contributing structures all constructed about 1876.  They are the Grandstand, half-mile Race track, Antiques Building, Taffy Stand,  Information Booth, and  the balldiamond bleacher stands.

It was listed on the National Register of Historic Places in 2002.

References

External links
Lewis County Fair

Buildings and structures in Lewis County, New York
Event venues on the National Register of Historic Places in New York (state)
Historic districts on the National Register of Historic Places in New York (state)
Tourist attractions in Lewis County, New York
National Register of Historic Places in Lewis County, New York